SCM Timișoara is a Romanian sports society from Timișoara, Romania, founded in 1947.

External links 
 Official website 
  

Sports clubs established in 1947
Multi-sport clubs in Romania
Sport in Timișoara
SCM Timișoara